Fire Truck is a black-and-white 1978 arcade game developed and published by Atari, Inc. According to GamesRadar, it was the earliest video game with cooperative gameplay where two players have to work together. Fire Truck is built on the multi-directional scrolling technology created for Atari's Super Bug released the previous year.

A single-player version was released as Smokey Joe. It is internally identical to Fire Truck. Both games were programmed by Howard Delman. Fire Truck was distributed in Japan by Namco.

Gameplay

Players must cooperate to drive the truck through traffic as far as possible without crashing.  While the game can be played with one player, it was primarily designed for two. The front player steers the tractor of the truck sitting down, controlling the gas and brakes, while the rear player stands and steers the tiller for the rear wheels, controlling the swing of the trailer.  The cabinet also provides the players with bells and horns, although these have no use in the actual game.

Reception
In the United States, RePlay magazine listed Smokey Joe as the ninth highest-grossing arcade game of 1978 and the original Fire Truck as the year's 12th highest-grossing title.

References

External links

1978 video games
Arcade video games
Arcade-only video games
Atari arcade games
Cooperative video games
Racing video games
Video games about firefighting
Video games developed in the United States